Ilya Rukober (born October 10, 1993) is a Russian professional wrestler, better known by his ring name Ilja Dragunov. He is currently signed to WWE, appearing on the NXT brand, and is a former NXT United Kingdom Champion. Prior to signing with WWE, Dragunov competed on the European independent circuit and is also known for his time with Westside Xtreme Wrestling (wXw), where he is a former one-time wXw Unified World Wrestling Champion, three-time wXw World Tag Team Champion and two-time wXw Shotgun Champion. Rukober is the first non-kayfabe Russian male wrestler to compete in the WWE, and is also  the first Russian-born champion in the company's history.

Early life
Rukober was born in Moscow, Russia and migrated to Germany with his mother when he was five years old. Neither he nor his mother could speak the German language. Prior to entering wrestling, Rukober worked various jobs from a young age to help provide for his family, including working at a pizza parlor and gas station.

Professional wrestling career

Early career (2012–2018)
Rukober started his professional wrestling training at the German Wrestling Federation (GWF) training school under veterans Axel Tischer (who wrestled for WWE under the ring name Alexander Wolfe) and Rick Baxxter. He made his in-ring debut in 2012. A year later, he became a regular with wXw and would remain there until getting signed by WWE.

Progress Wrestling (2018–present)
On 14 May 2018 at Super Strong Style 16, wXw general manager Christian Michael Jakobi arrived in Progress Wrestling, and challenged Pete Dunne to a match with Dragunov at an undetermined date. At Chapter 69, Dragunov appeared in the promotion for the first time, squaring off with Dunne, much to Jakobi's delight. At Chapter 72, Dunne accepted the challenge and the match would be set at Progress' upcoming event at Wembley Arena. At Chapter 75, Jakobi continued to insult Dunne, to which he would drag Jakobi to the ring to attack him, before Dragunov made the save and the two faced off again. During Progress' tour of Germany, at the Oberhausen show, Dunne called out Dragunov, following British Strong Style's win over Rise (Ivan Kiev, Lucky Kid and Pete Bouncer). Once again, the two had a scuffle which had to be broken up by the officials. On 1 October, Dragunov's debut match for Progress ended in defeat, when Dunne trapped Dragunov's arm and then manipulated his hand to force the submission.

Dragunov began 2019 with a win over Timothy Thatcher at Chapter 83, but did not appear for the promotion until Super Strong Style 16. On night one, Dragunov defeated Chris Brookes in the first round. On night two, he quickly defeated Trevor Lee in the quarter-final, and on night three, he was in a three way elimination match in the semi-final with David Starr and Travis Banks. Dragunov was the first wrestler to be eliminated when Banks defeated him by pinfall. At Chapter 91, he defeated Jordan Devlin in a number one contender match for the Unified World Championship, but the following day, at Chapter 92, he was defeated by Walter.

At Chapter 95, Dragunov took part in a rumble match for the Proteus Championship, which replaced the Atlas Championship. Dragunov entered in at number two in the match, and eliminated Niwa, TK Cooper and Chuck Mambo, before he and William Eaver simultaneously eliminated each other. From October to December, he was involved in a series of matches with Cara Noir. Having traded wins over each other at Chapter 96 and Chapter 97, the feud was ended at Chapter 99 in a two out of three falls match, in which Dragunov lost.

WWE (2019–present)

Early beginnings (2019–2021) 
During January 2019, it was reported that Rukober would be signing with WWE, with the intention of performing for the promotion's NXT UK brand. He previously had a tryout for the promotion in November 2013, but suffered a skull injury which kept him out for almost a year. He had a second tryout in Cologne during WWE's European tour in November 2018, where he was said to have "turned heads". On February 27, 2019, WWE officially announced his signing. On the May 15 episode of NXT UK (taped April 19), Dragunov made his debut for the brand as a fan favorite, defeating Jack Starz. He then began a short undefeated streak, defeating Joseph Conners on the June 12 episode (taped April 20), and Ashton Smith on the July 10 episode (taped June 16). However, this ended on the August 15 episode (taped July 19), when Dragunov was defeated by Kassius Ohno. On August 31, at NXT UK TakeOver: Cardiff, Dragunov answered Cesaro's open challenge in a losing effort.

On the October 17 episode of NXT UK (taped October 4), Dragunov defeated Saxon Huxley under the watchful eye of Alexander Wolfe. Following the win, Wolfe applauded Dragunov, which turned into a brief staredown with the Russian when Marcel Barthel and Fabian Aichner joined him. However, it did not turn into a fight, as Barthel and Aichner walked past Dragunov for their match against The Hunt (Primate and Wild Boar), while Wolfe took him to the back, presumably to convince him to join Imperium. On the November 11 episode of NXT UK (taped October 5), Dragunov seemingly joined Imperium in their ongoing feud with Gallus (Joe Coffey, Mark Coffey and Wolfgang), before allying himself with the Scotsmen, who then proceeded to have a brawl in the ring as the show went off the air. On the November 21 episode of NXT UK (taped November 15), Dragunov was defeated by Wolfe, and after the match, was beaten down by the other members of Imperium before Gallus made the save. On the November 28 episode of NXT UK (taped November 15), Dragunov alongside Gallus, fought Imperium to a double countout. Although he got some offence in on Wolfe, he was mostly overpowered by the other members of Imperium, including a call back to the 2017 wXw 16 Carat Gold final with its leader Walter. On the December 5 episode of NXT UK (taped November 15), Dragunov appeared during the main event negotiation segment between Walter and Joe Coffey, for their title match at NXT UK TakeOver: Blackpool II. Walter wanted Dragunov to face Wolfe in a no disqualification match at a future date, but Coffey refused, since Dragunov was not a member of Gallus. Walter then said "No Ilja, no deal", to which Dragunov came out from the back and told Coffey to make the agreement. Following the negotiations, Walter told Dragunov that he had made a really bad decision, and the Russian was ambushed by the other members of Imperium before being powerbombed by Wolfe through a table. On the January 2, 2020 episode of NXT UK (taped November 16, 2019), Dragunov defeated Wolfe in the no disqualification match. In retaliation, he was beaten down by Barthel and Aichner after the match.

On January 12, during the main event title match between Walter and Coffey, Wolfe interfered in the match attacking the latter, leading to Dragunov coming out and hitting the Torpedo Moscow on Wolfe, which caused him to accidentally fall on Coffey's left knee, exacerbating the injury. On the February 13 episode of NXT UK (taped January 18), after Gallus had retained the NXT UK Tag Team Championship over Oney Lorcan and Danny Burch, Dragunov came out to confront Gallus, but was outnumbered and suffered a beat down. This was due to Coffey earlier stating that Dragunov owed "the Gallus firm" a debt, and it led to a match between the two men on the February 20 episode of NXT UK (taped January 18), resulting in Dragunov defeating Coffey. After the match, the other two members of Gallus appeared in order to commit a post-match assault on the Russian, but Coffey stopped them and informed Dragunov that he had paid his debt and that matters were now settled. Parallel to the Coffey storyline on NXT UK, Dragunov also appeared on NXT programming in promos with Finn Bálor. He accepted Balor's challenge to a singles match at Worlds Collide on January 25, where he was defeated.

On the April 2 episode of NXT UK (taped March 7), Dragunov won a 20-man battle royal to become the #1 contender for the NXT United Kingdom Championship, last eliminating Tyler Bate. Due to the United Kingdom's handling of the COVID-19 pandemic, NXT UK was put on hold and was relaunched in September, being filmed behind closed doors at Here East. On the September 17 episode of NXT UK, after Dragunov defeated Noam Dar, he was confronted by Walter and their feud was reignited. On the October 1 episode of NXT UK, Dragunov made the save on guest referee Pete Dunne, who was being beat down by Walter and Wolfe, following the latter's loss to Dar in the NXT UK Heritage Cup first round. This led to a tag team match between the four men on the October 15 episode of NXT UK, in which Dragunov and Dunne were victorious. On the October 22 episode of NXT UK, during the contract signing segment, Dragunov was stopped from finishing his catchphrase as he was struck in the face by Walter, who then tore his shirt off and started chopping him. He escaped but withstood more damage as Walter chopped him in mid-air, hit a powerbomb to him on the ring apron, followed by more chops. However, it was not enough to put him down, as he ran at Walter through the railings. On the October 29 episode of NXT UK, he was defeated by Walter by referee stoppage, due to him passing out after being put in a rear naked choke. The match gained critical acclaim, and Dave Meltzer in particular, rated it 5 stars out of 5. WWE were quick to capitalize on this, uploading a playback video eight days after it aired, with commentary by Shawn Michaels, William Regal, Wade Barrett, Sheamus, Drew McIntyre, Cesaro, Tyson Kidd, Killian Dain and Drake Maverick.

Dragunov returned to the brand in January 2021. Haunted by the loss to Walter, he struggled to keep his emotions in check, resulting in his matches ending by referee stoppage. He then had a short feud with Sam Gradwell, who kept trash talking him throughout his match with Tyson T-Bone. On the March 4 episode of NXT UK, their first match initially ended by referee stoppage and was changed to a win for Gradwell by disqualification, as Dragunov kept attacking him after the bell. On the March 25 episode of NXT UK, the second match (a no disqualification match) ended by referee's decision, after Dragunov forced Gradwell to tap out following several ground-and-pound strikes to the Englishman. On the May 6 episode of NXT UK, Dragunov faced Dave Mastiff, who had offered to fight him the previous week. The bout was cut short due to referee stoppage, but this was legitimate instead of scripted, as Mastiff actually had his nose broken, and the storyline of Dragunov's matches ending in this way was scrapped.

NXT United Kingdom Champion (2021–2022) 
On the June 3 episode of NXT UK, Dragunov defeated Dar in a singles match, following an altercation the two had on "Supernova Sessions". He later appeared after the main event, staring down Joe Coffey and Rampage Brown. On the June 24 episode of NXT UK, Dragunov defeated Coffey and Brown in a triple threat match to again become the #1 contender for the NXT United Kingdom Championship. Afterwards, Walter held Dragunov in a sleeper hold until he passed out. On the July 15 episode of NXT UK, during the in-ring press conference segment, Walter berated and belittled Dragunov. In turn, he told Walter that while he once respected him, he no longer did and all that is left is hate. It was revealed that Walter had an injured hand and was unable to defend the title on July 22. Triple H, Michaels and Regal announced that the match would happen a month later, at NXT TakeOver 36. Dragunov made his debut for NXT on the August 10 episode of NXT, where he addressed the crowd but was interrupted by Dunne (who, by this point, had turned heel since their brief alliance in NXT UK). In the main event, Dragunov was distracted by Walter turning up, leading to him being defeated by Dunne, who countered the Torpedo Moscow with a forearm, followed by The Bitter End. On the August 17 episode of NXT, Dragunov answered Roderick Strong's open challenge in a winning effort. On August 22, at NXT TakeOver 36, Dragunov defeated Walter in yet another critically acclaimed match by submission, ending the Austrian's two-year hold on the NXT United Kingdom Championship. On an episode of NXT UK, Dragunov defeated A-Kid to retain his NXT UK Championship. On the 27 January 2022 episode of NXT UK Dragunov made another successful title defense against Jordan Devlin in an empty arena match. On another episode of NXT UK, Dragunov would successfully defend the NXT United Kingdom Championship against Roderick Strong. After back and forth verbal shots with Jordan Devlin, another match for Dragunov's NXT UK championship was made, under the stipulation that the loser leaves NXT UK. The match would take place on the 200th episode of NXT UK where Dragunov retained his title, and Devlin had to leave (kayfabe) NXT UK. He was forced to vacate the title on July 7, 2022 after he suffered an injury.

NXT (2022–present) 
On the September 20 episode of NXT, Dragunov made his return, interrupting a segment between NXT Champion Bron Breakker and number one contender JD McDonagh.

Other media 
Rukober made his video game debut in the Most Wanted Pack DLC for WWE 2K22.

Championship and accomplishments 
 CBS Sports
 Match of the Year (2020) vs. Walter
 German Wrestling Federation/Next Step Wrestling
 NSW (European) Championship (2 times)
 Pro Wrestling Illustrated
 Ranked No. 72 of the top 500 singles wrestlers in the PWI 500 in 2022
 Westside Xtreme Wrestling
 wXw Unified World Wrestling Championship (1 time)
 wXw World Tag Team Championship (3 times) – with Robert Dreissker (1), Dirty Dragan and Julian Nero (1), Walter (1)
 wXw Shotgun Championship (2 times)
International Tag Team Tournament (2018) - with Avalanche
 16 Carat Gold Tournament (2017)
Mitteldeutschland Cup (2013)
wXw Shotgun Championship Tournament (2013)
 WWE
 NXT United Kingdom Championship (1 time)

References

External links
 
 
 
 

Living people
1993 births
Martial artists from Moscow
Russian male professional wrestlers
NXT United Kingdom Champions
Russian emigrants to Germany
German male professional wrestlers
21st-century professional wrestlers